Wilmar Enrique Barrios Terán (born 16 October 1993) is a Colombian professional footballer who plays as a defensive midfielder for Russian club Zenit Saint Petersburg and the Colombia national team.

Born in Cartagena, Colombia, Barrios relocated to Ibagué where he made professional football debut with Deportes Tolima. During his time with Tolima, Barrios notably won the Copa Colombia in 2014. In 2016, he was acquired by Argentine giants Boca Juniors. Barrios won two trophies with the Xeneizes: the Primera División in 2017 and 2018. In 2019, he joined Russian Premier League side FC Zenit Saint Petersburg on an initial 4,5-year contract; in 2021, his contract was extended until 2026. Since his arrival to the club, Barrios has won six trophies with Zenit, including four league titles, the Russian Cup and the Russian Super Cup.

Before debuting with Colombia in 2016, Barrios represented his country's Olympic team at the 2016 Summer Olympics. Since then, he has earned over 50 caps. Barrios was part of the Colombia squad that took part in the 2018 World Cup. Additionally, Barrios represented Colombia at the 2019 and 2021 editions of the Copa América, achieving a third-place finish in the latter.

Club career
Barrios was given a red card for two bookable offences during the second leg of the 2018 Copa Libertadores Finals against rivals River Plate held at the Santiago Bernabéu Stadium.

On 1 February 2019, he signed a 4,5-year contract with Zenit Saint Petersburg. On 19 October 2021, Barrios extended his contract with Zenit until the end of the 2025–26 season.

International career
Barrios was named in Colombia's provisional squad for Copa América Centenario, but was cut from the final squad.

In May 2018, he was named in Colombia's final 23-man squad for the 2018 World Cup in Russia.

On 27 September 2022, Barrios scored his first goal for Colombia, the winning goal in a 3–2 friendly win against Mexico.

Career statistics

Club

International

Scores and results list Colombia's goal tally first, score column indicates score after each Barrios goal.

Honours
Deportes Tolima
Copa Colombia: 2014

Boca Juniors
Argentine Primera División: 2016–17, 2017–18

Zenit Saint Petersburg
Russian Premier League: 2018–19, 2019–20, 2020–21, 2021–22
Russian Cup: 2019–20
Russian Super Cup: 2020, 2022

References

External links

Profile at the FC Zenit Saint Petersburg website

1993 births
Living people
Sportspeople from Cartagena, Colombia
Colombian footballers
Colombia international footballers
Association football midfielders
Deportes Tolima footballers
Boca Juniors footballers
FC Zenit Saint Petersburg players
Categoría Primera A players
Argentine Primera División players
Russian Premier League players
Footballers at the 2016 Summer Olympics
Olympic footballers of Colombia
2018 FIFA World Cup players
2019 Copa América players
2021 Copa América players
Colombian expatriate footballers
Expatriate footballers in Argentina
Expatriate footballers in Russia
Colombian expatriate sportspeople in Argentina
Colombian expatriate sportspeople in Russia
Colombian people of African descent